1954 was the 55th season of County Championship cricket in England. Pakistan toured England for the first time and drew the series of four Test matches. Surrey won the County Championship for the third successive year.

Honours
County Championship – Surrey
Minor Counties Championship – Surrey II
Wisden – Bruce Dooland, Fazal Mahmood, Eric Hollies, Brian Statham, George Tribe

Test series

England could only draw the series with Pakistan 1–1, with the other two matches badly affected by the poor weather of the summer and left drawn.  Pakistan won the final Test to square the series thanks to a marvellous seam bowling performance by Fazal Mahmood, who took 6-53 and 6–46 at The Oval.

County Championship

Leading batsmen
Denis Compton topped the averages with 1524 runs @ 58.62

Leading bowlers
Brian Statham topped the averages with 92 wickets @ 14.13

References

Annual reviews
 Playfair Cricket Annual 1955
 Wisden Cricketers' Almanack 1955

External links
 CricketArchive – season summary

1954 in English cricket
English cricket seasons in the 20th century